Tompsett is a surname. Notable people with the surname include:

Michael Francis Tompsett (born 1939), British physicist, engineer, and inventor
Oliver Tompsett (born 1981), English actor and singer

See also
 Michael Thomsett, British-born American author